2017 Punjab Legislative Assembly election for the constitution of the Fifteenth Legislative Assembly was held in the Indian state of Punjab on 4 February 2017 to elect the 117 members of the Punjab Legislative Assembly. The counting of votes was done on 11 March 2017.

The term of the fifteenth Punjab assembly  ended with its dissolution on 11 March 2022. The dissolution was necessitated after the results of the election was declared on 10 March.

Office bearers

Committees

2021-2022
The list of chairmen from May 2021 to March 2022.

Members of Punjab Legislative Assembly 
Members of the Punjab Legislative Assembly elected in 2017. List updated as of 3 June 2019

By-Elections 
2018 bypolls in Punjab

2019 Bypolls in Punjab

References

15th
2017 establishments in Punjab, India